The CVX (formerly known as LPX-II, Hangul: 대형수송함-II) is a class of aircraft carriers currently under development for the Republic of Korea Navy. The class is follow-on from the previous s which prioritized amphibious capability,while the CVX will be designed for fixed wing and rotary wing operations instead, constituting a traditional aircraft carrier. The planned development of the class was formally announced and funded as part of the 2020~2024 Mid-Term Defense Plan (국방중기계획), published in December 2020.

Background 
The introduction of the CVX into service is a continuation of the development of a blue water navy by the Republic of Korea Navy, a process begun in 2001.

The development of the blue water navy reflects the geopolitical circumstances which the Republic of Korea faces. At present, its two closest neighbors (China and Japan) are in the process of developing full aircraft carrier capability for their respective navies. The Japanese Maritime Self Defence Force (JMSDF) operates the  helicopter carriers and  multi-purpose operation destroyers (de facto aircraft carriers) while the People's Liberation Army Navy currently operates the carriers Liaoning (Type 001) and Shandong (Type 002) and plans to commission the Fujian (Type 003) in 2023.

Development 
In late 2020, design and acquisition work on the CVX class was sped up in the hope of countering naval expansions in South Korea's neighbors. This move is expected to bring forward the aircraft carrier's future in-service date by one year, and will require a hastened procurement process for the F-35B fighter jets that the warship will carry. , work on the CVX will begin in 2022 and end in 2033.

On the occasion of the MADEX trade fair in South Korea in June 2021, the Italian Fincantieri signed a contract with Daewoo Shipbuilding & Marine Engineering (DSME) for assistance in the design of the CVX. The South Koreans were seeking the support of an industrialist with experience in this field.

Specifications
Unlike the preceding Dokdo class, the CVX will not feature a well deck for amphibious assault craft. Instead, internal space will be dedicated to aircraft storage and maintenance. The flight deck will be of an axial design rather than using a ski-jump (used by other F-35B jet aircraft operators except for the United States Navy).

The CVX will be one of the few aircraft carriers in the world to feature two islands. The UK defense corporation Babcock International has been providing support to the CVX program and is a possible explanation for the twin-island design as Babcock led the development of the  aircraft carrier program for the Royal Navy.

The Republic of Korea government has stated that the sensor and weapons fit for the CVX will be developed domestically and the ship will feature a multi-function radar (MFR) for ballistic missile defence (BMD). The same system will be used about the next generation destroyer for the Republic of Korea Navy (KDDX).

Aviation
The CVX will be the first class of aircraft carriers in the Republic of Korea Navy, in contrast to the Dokdo class of amphibious assault ships which have features such as a well deck to accommodate amphibious assault vehicles. The Ministry of National Defense confirmed in August 2020 that twenty F-35Bs would be procured for the CVX. In terms of rotary wing aviation, the ship will accommodate the future Marine Attack Helicopters (based on MUH-1 Marineon) of the ROK Marine Corps.

References

External links
 navalnews.com, South Korea officially starts LPX-II aircraft carrier program
 US Naval Institute, LPX-II
 Shepherd Media, South Korea reveals imagery of LPX-II carrier
 The Diplomat, Republic of Korea Navy
 Republic of Korea Navy Homepage
 Maritime Executive, South Korea is developing its first aircraft carrier
 Popular Mechanics, South Korea Is Packing Its First Aircraft Carrier with F-35s
 globalsecurity.org, LPX-II

Helicopter carrier classes
Amphibious warfare vessel classes
Amphibious warfare vessels of the Republic of Korea Navy
 Dokdo class landing platform experimental ships
 Dokdo class landing platform experimental ships
Proposed ships